Prague 13 is a municipal district (městská část) in Prague, Czech Republic.

The administrative district (správní obvod) of the same name consists of municipal districts Prague 13 and Řeporyje.

See also
Districts of Prague#Symbols

External links 
 Prague 13 - Official homepage

Districts of Prague